The first modern patent Atonumas Vehicles  was invented by William L Kelley in 1990 ie. Collision Predicting and Avoiding Device for Moving Vehicles. #4926171

Experiments have been conducted on self-driving cars since 1939; promising trials took place in the 1950s and work has proceeded since then. The first self-sufficient and truly autonomous cars appeared in the 1980s, with Carnegie Mellon University's Navlab and ALV projects in 1984 and Mercedes-Benz and Bundeswehr University Munich's Eureka Prometheus Project in 1987. Since then, numerous major companies and research organizations have developed working autonomous vehicles including Mercedes-Benz, General Motors, Continental Automotive Systems, Autoliv Inc., Bosch, Nissan, Toyota, Audi, Volvo, Vislab from University of Parma, Oxford University and Google. In July 2013, Vislab demonstrated BRAiVE, a vehicle that moved autonomously on a mixed traffic route open to public traffic.

Some UNECE members and EU members and the UK have some rules and regulations related to automated and fully automated cars: In Europe, cities in Belgium, France, Italy and the UK are planning to operate transport systems for driverless cars, and Germany, the Netherlands, and Spain have allowed testing robotic cars in traffic.

In 2019 in Japan, related legislation for Level 3 was completed by amending two laws, and they came into effect in April 2020.
In 2021 in Germany, related legislation for Level 4 was completed.
, the UK and the EU are also on track to regulate automated cars.

History

1920s
In 1925, Houdina Radio Control demonstrated the radio-controlled "American Wonder" on New York City streets, traveling up Broadway and down Fifth Avenue through the thick of a traffic jam. The American Wonder was a 1926 Chandler that was equipped with a transmitting antenna on the tonneau and was operated by a person in another car that followed it and sent out radio impulses which were caught by the transmitting antenna. The antenna introduced the signals to circuit-breakers which operated small electric motors that directed every movement of the car.

Achen Motor, a distributor of cars in Milwaukee and surrounding territory, used Francis' invention under the name "Phantom Auto" and demonstrated it in December 1926 on the streets of Milwaukee. It was demonstrated again in June 1932 on the streets of Fredericksburg as a feature attraction of Bigger Bargain Day, in which most of the merchants of the city participated.

1930s
An early depiction of automated guided cars was Norman Bel Geddes's Futurama exhibit sponsored by General Motors at the 1939 World's Fair, which showed radio-controlled electric cars propelled via electromagnetic fields provided by circuits embedded in the roadway.

Bel Geddes later outlined his vision in his book Magic Motorways (1940), promoting advances in highway design and transportation, foreshadowing the Interstate Highway System, and arguing that humans should be removed from the process of driving. Bel Geddes predicted these advances to be a reality in 1960.

1950s
In 1953, RCA Labs successfully created a system with a miniature car guided and controlled by wires laid in a pattern on a laboratory floor. The system sparked the imagination of Leland M. Hancock, traffic engineer in the Nebraska Department of Roads, and of his director, L. N. Ress, state engineer. The decision was made to experiment with the system in actual highway installations.

In 1957, a full size system was successfully demonstrated by RCA Labs and the State of Nebraska on a 400-foot strip of public highway at the intersection of U.S. Route 77 and Nebraska Highway 2, then just outside Lincoln, Nebraska. A series of experimental detector circuits buried in the pavement was paired with a series of lights along the edge of the road. The detector circuits were able to send impulses to guide the car and determine the presence and velocity of any metallic vehicle on its surface. A previous test installation of the system in September 1954 along U.S. Route 73 and U.S. Route 75 in Cass County, Nebraska, was utilized as an experimental traffic counter. It was developed in collaboration with General Motors, who provided two standard car models with equipment consisting of special radio receivers and audible and visual warning devices that were able to simulate automatic steering, acceleration, and brake control.

It was further demonstrated on 5 June 1960, at RCA Lab's headquarters in Princeton, New Jersey, where reporters were allowed to "drive" the cars. Commercialization of the system was expected to happen by 1975.

In addition, during the 1950s and throughout the 1960s, General Motors showcased its Firebirds, a series of experimental cars that were described as having an "electronic guide system [that] can rush it over an automatic highway while the driver relaxes".

Radar Assistance Systems - also with emergancy break functionality - were introduced in concept cars by major companies in the 1950s. Ford had Radar in the FX Atomos concept car with visualized information on a 'Roadarscope'. GM demonstrated the break assist in a Cadillac Cyclone 1959.

1960s
In 1960, Ohio State University's Communication and Control Systems Laboratory launched a project to develop driverless cars which were activated by electronic devices embedded in the roadway. Head of the project, Dr. Robert L. Cosgriff, claimed in 1966 that the system could be ready for installation on a public road in 15 years.

In the early 1960s, the Bureau of Public Roads considered the construction of an experimental electronically controlled highway. Four states – Ohio, Massachusetts, New York and California – were bidding for the construction. In August 1961, Popular Science reported on the Aeromobile 35B, an air-cushion vehicle (ACV) that was invented by William Bertelsen and was envisioned to revolutionize the transportation system, with personal self-driving hovering cars that could speed up to 150 Mph.

During the 1960s, the United Kingdom's Transport and Road Research Laboratory tested a driverless Citroen DS that interacted with magnetic cables that were embedded in the road. It went through a test track at  without deviation of speed or direction in any weather conditions, and in a far more effective way than by human control. Research continued in the 1970s with cruise control devices activated by signals in the cabling beneath the tracks. According to cost benefit analyses that were made, adoption of system on the British motorways would be repaid by end of the century, increase the road capacity by at least 50% and prevent around 40% of the accidents. Funding for these experiments was withdrawn by the mid-1970s.

Also, during the 1960s and the 1970s, Bendix Corporation developed and tested driverless cars that were powered and controlled by buried cables, with wayside communicators relaying computer messages. Stanford demonstrated its Artificial Intelligence Laboratory Cart, a small wheeled robot that once accidentally navigated onto a nearby road.

Preliminary research into the intelligent automated logic needed for autonomous cars was conducted  at the Coordinated Science Laboratory of the University of Illinois in the early to mid 1970s.

1980s
Subsequently, EUREKA conducted the  Prometheus Project on autonomous vehicles from 1987 to 1995.
But the first patented Inventor was William L Kelley, called Collision Predicting and Avoiding Device for Moving Vehicles in May 1990 #4926171.
In the same decade, the DARPA-funded Autonomous Land driven Vehicle (ALV) project in the United States made use of new technologies developed by the University of Maryland, Carnegie Mellon University, the Environmental Research Institute of Michigan, Martin Marietta and SRI International. In 1987, HRL Laboratories (formerly Hughes Research Labs) demonstrated the first off-road map and sensor-based autonomous navigation on the ALV. By 1989, Carnegie Mellon University had pioneered the use of neural networks to steer and otherwise control autonomous vehicles, forming the basis of contemporary control strategies.

1990s
In 1991, the United States Congress passed the ISTEA Transportation Authorization bill, which instructed USDOT to "demonstrate an automated vehicle and highway system by 1997."  The Federal Highway Administration took on this task, first with a series of Precursor Systems Analyses and then by establishing the National Automated Highway System Consortium (NAHSC). This cost-shared project was led by FHWA and General Motors, with Caltrans, Delco, Parsons Brinkerhoff, Bechtel, UC-Berkeley, Carnegie Mellon University, and Lockheed Martin as additional partners.  Extensive systems engineering work and research culminated in Demo '97  on I-15 in San Diego, California, in which about 20 automated vehicles, including cars, buses, and trucks, were demonstrated to thousands of onlookers, attracting extensive media coverage.  The demonstrations involved close-headway platooning intended to operate in segregated traffic, as well as "free agent" vehicles intended to operate in mixed traffic.  Other carmakers were invited to demonstrate their systems, such that Toyota and Honda also participated.  While the subsequent aim was to produce a system design to aid commercialization, the program was cancelled in the late 1990s due to tightening research budgets at USDOT. Overall funding for the program was in the range of $90 million.

In June 1993, professor 한민홍 (Han Min-Hong) in South Korea worked on a self-driving car. He used a Asia Motors 록스타 to test his car by having it drive around Seoul, accumulating a total of 17 kilometers travelled. Two years later, in 1995, a different car was tested by driving from Seoul to Busan via the Gyeongbu Highway in 1995. As his work was ahead of its time in South Korea, the government focused on heavy industry like steel and shipbuilding at the time. As a result, government funding for his research was cut in the 고려대학교 (Korea University) for his project. The consequences of this resulted in the termination of the self-driving car development in South Korea. "It was born too early." "The technology couldn't catch up with the era." "Even if we entered the era a bit late, we could have become an Elon Musk of Korea." "It was the wrong era." These were some of the words that were spoken by Korean Netizens, who expressed disappointment about the cancellation of the program years later."

They demonstrated autonomous driving in free lanes, convoy driving, and lane changes with autonomous passing of other cars. That same year, Lucas Industries developed parts for a semi-autonomous car in a project that was funded by Jaguar Cars, Lucas, and the UK Department of Trade and Industry.

In 1995, Carnegie Mellon University's Navlab project completed a  cross-country journey, of which 98.2% was autonomously controlled, dubbed "No Hands Across America". This car, however, was semi-autonomous by nature: it used neural networks to control the steering wheel, but throttle and brakes were human-controlled, chiefly for safety reasons. Also in 1995, Dickmanns' re-engineered autonomous S-Class Mercedes-Benz undertook a  journey from Munich in Bavaria, Germany to Copenhagen, Denmark and back, using saccadic computer vision and transputers to react in real time. It drove in traffic, executing manoeuvres to pass other cars. Despite being a research system without emphasis on long distance reliability, it drove up to  without human intervention.

In 1996, (now Professor) Alberto Broggi of the University of Parma launched  the ARGO Project, which worked on enabling a modified Lancia Thema to follow the normal (painted) lane marks in an unmodified highway. The car operated in fully automatic mode for 94% of its journey, with the longest automatic stretch being . The vehicle had only two black-and-white low-cost video cameras on board and used stereoscopic vision algorithms to understand its environment.

The ParkShuttle, billed as the world's first driverless vehicle, is an automated people mover which uses artificial reference points (magnets) embedded in the road surface to verify its position. Two pilot projects were started in the Netherlands, at Schiphol Airport (December 1997) and business park Rivium (1999). Both carried members of the general public and as such claim stake to the title to the first driverless vehicles. The vehicles are autonomous, do not feature a steering wheel or pedals, nor do they have a safety driver or steward on board. They drive at grade, on a dedicated lane which does feature intersections with pedestrians, bicyclists and cars.

2000s
The US Government funded three military efforts known as Demo I (US Army), Demo II (DARPA), and Demo III (US Army). Demo III (2001) demonstrated the ability of unmanned ground vehicles to navigate miles of difficult off-road terrain, avoiding obstacles such as rocks and trees.  James Albus at the National Institute of Standards and Technology provided the Real-Time Control System which is a hierarchical control system.  Not only were individual vehicles controlled (e.g. throttle, steering, and brake), but groups of vehicles had their movements automatically coordinated in response to high level goals.

In the first Grand Challenge held in March 2004,  DARPA (the Defense Advanced Research Projects Agency) offered a $1 million prize to any team of robotic engineers which could create an autonomous car capable of finishing a 150-mile course in the Mojave Desert.  No team was successful in completing the course.

In October 2005, the second DARPA Grand Challenge was again held in a desert environment.  GPS points were placed and obstacle types were located in advance. This year, five vehicles completed the course. David Hall of Velodyne competed in the event with a prototype lidar sensor, which he then manufactured with Velodyne LiDAR. Lidar quickly became an integral sensor for self-driving vehicles, and five out of six of the vehicles that finished the 2007 DARPA Urban Challenge used Velodyne's product.

In November 2007, DARPA again sponsored Grand Challenge III, but this time the Challenge was held in an urban environment. In this race, a 2007 Chevy Tahoe autonomous car from Carnegie Mellon University earned the 1st place. Prize competitions as DARPA Grand Challenges gave students and researchers an opportunity to research a project on autonomous cars to reduce the burden of transportation problems such as traffic congestion and traffic accidents that increasingly exist on many urban residents.

In January 2006, the United Kingdom's 'Foresight' think-tank revealed a report which predicts RFID-tagged driverless cars on UK's roads by 2056 and the Royal Academy of Engineering claimed that driverless trucks could be on Britain's motorways by 2019.

In 1998, Willie Jones  states that many automakers consider autonomous technology as part of their research yearly. He notes "In May 1998, Toyota became the first to introduce an Adaptive Cruise Control (ACC) system on a production vehicle when it unveiled a laser-based system for its Progres compact luxury sedan, which it sold in Japan".

Autonomous vehicles have also been used in mining. In December 2008, Rio Tinto Alcan began testing the Komatsu Autonomous Haulage System – the world's first commercial autonomous mining haulage system – in the Pilbara iron ore mine in Western Australia. Rio Tinto has reported benefits in health, safety, and productivity. In November 2011, Rio Tinto signed a deal to greatly expand its fleet of driverless trucks.

Google began developing its self-driving cars in 2009, but did so privately, avoiding public announcement of the program until a later time.

2010s 

Many major automotive manufacturers, including General Motors, Ford, Mercedes Benz, Volkswagen, Audi, Nissan, Toyota, BMW, and Volvo, are in the process of testing driverless car systems. BMW has been testing driverless systems since around 2005, while in 2010, Audi sent a driverless Audi TTS to the top of Pike’s Peak at close to race speeds. In 2011, GM created the EN-V (short for Electric Networked Vehicle), an autonomous electric urban vehicle. Ford has conducted extensive research into driverless systems and vehicular communication systems. In January 2013, Toyota demonstrated a partially self-driving car with numerous sensors and communication systems. Other programs in the field include the 2GetThere passenger vehicles from the Netherlands and the DARPA Grand Challenge in the USA; some plans for bimodal public transport systems include autonomous cars as a component.

In 2010, Italy's VisLab from the University of Parma, led by Professor Alberto Broggi, ran the VisLab Intercontinental Autonomous Challenge (VIAC), a  test run which marked the first intercontinental land journey completed by autonomous vehicles. Four electric vans made a 100-day journey, leaving Parma, Italy, on 20 July 2010, and arriving at the Shanghai Expo in China on 28 October.

The research project is co-funded by the European Union CORDIS program.

In 2010, the Institute of Control Engineering of the Technische Universität Braunschweig demonstrated the first autonomous driving on public streets in Germany with the research vehicle Leonie.  It was the first car licensed for autonomous driving on the streets and highways in Germany.

In October 2010, an attorney for the California Department of Motor Vehicles, raised concerns that "[t]he technology is ahead of the law in many areas", citing state laws that "all presume to have a human being operating the vehicle".

In 2011, the Freie Universität Berlin developed two autonomous cars to drive in the innercity traffic of Berlin in Germany. Led by the AutoNOMOS group, the two vehicles Spirit of Berlin and MadeInGermany handled intercity traffic, traffic lights and roundabouts between International Congress Centrum and Brandenburg Gate. It was financed by the German Federal Ministry of Education and Research.

Nevada passed a law in June 2011 concerning the operation of autonomous cars in Nevada, which went into effect on March 1, 2012. A Toyota Prius modified with Google's experimental driverless technology was licensed by the Nevada Department of Motor Vehicles (DMV) in May 2012. This was the first license issued in the United States for a self-driven car. License plates issued in Nevada for testing autonomous cars have a red background and feature an infinity symbol (∞) on the left side because, according to the DMV Director,  "...using the infinity symbol was the best way to represent the 'car of the future. Nevada's test regulations required a person behind the wheel and one in the passenger's seat during tests.

On May 1, 2012, a  driving test was administered to a Google self-driving car by Nevada motor vehicle examiners in a test route in the city of Las Vegas, Nevada.  The autonomous car passed the test, but was not tested at roundabouts, no-signal railroad crossings, or school zones.

In April 2012, Florida became the second state in the United States to allow the testing of autonomous cars on public roads, and California became the third when Governor Jerry Brown signed the bill into law at Google Headquarters in Mountain View.

In 2013, on July 12, VisLab conducted another pioneering test of autonomous vehicles, during which a robotic vehicle drove in downtown Parma with no human control, successfully navigating roundabouts, traffic lights, pedestrian crossings and other common hazards.

In August 2013, Daimler R&D with Karlsruhe Institute of Technology/FZI, made a Mercedes-Benz S-class vehicle with close-to-production stereo cameras  and radars drive completely autonomously for about 100 km from Mannheim to Pforzheim, Germany, following the historic Bertha Benz Memorial Route.

In August 2013 Nissan announced its plans to launch several driverless cars by 2020. The company is building in Japan a dedicated autonomous driving proving ground, to be completed in 2014. Nissan installed its autonomous car technology in a Nissan Leaf electric car for demonstration purposes. The car was demonstrated at Nissan 360 test drive event held in California in August 2013. In September 2013, the Leaf fitted the prototype Advanced Driver Assistance System was granted a license plate that allows to drive it on Japanese public roads. The testing car will be used by Nissan engineers to evaluate how its in-house autonomous driving software performs in the real world. Time spent on public roads will help refine the car's software for fully automated driving. The autonomous Leaf was demonstrated on public roads for the first time at a media event held in Japan in November 2013. The Leaf drove on the Sagami Expressway in Kanagawa prefecture, near Tokyo. Nissan vice chairman Toshiyuki Shiga and the prefecture's Governor, Yuji Kuroiwa, rode in the car during the test.

Released in 2013, the 2014 Infiniti Q50 uses cameras, radar and other technology to deliver various lane-keeping, collision avoidance and cruise control features. One reviewer remarked, "With the Q50 managing its own speed and adjusting course, I could sit back and simply watch, even on mildly curving highways, for three or more miles at a stretch," adding that he wasn't touching the steering wheel or pedals.

Although as of 2013, fully autonomous vehicles are not yet available to the public, many contemporary car models have features offering limited autonomous functionality. These include adaptive cruise control, a system that monitors distances to adjacent vehicles in the same lane, adjusting the speed with the flow of traffic; lane assist, which monitors the vehicle's position in the lane, and either warns the driver when the vehicle is leaving its lane, or, less commonly, takes corrective actions; and parking assist, which assists the driver in the task of parallel parking.

In January 2014, Induct Technology's Navia shuttle became the first self-driving vehicle to be available for commercial sale. It is intended to shuttle people around "pedestrianized city centers, large industrial sites, airports, theme parks, university campuses or hospital complexes."

On May 27, 2014, Google announced plans to unveil 100 autonomous car prototypes built from scratch inside Google's secret X lab, as manifestations of years of work that began by modifying existing vehicles, along with, "in the next couple of years" according to Google in the above blog post, a pilot program similar to that which was used for the Cr-48 Chromebook back in 2010.

In October 2014 Tesla Motors announced its first version of Autopilot. Model S cars equipped with this system are capable of lane control with autonomous steering, braking, and speed limit adjustment based on signals image recognition. The system also provides autonomous parking and is able to receive software updates to improve skills over time.

In 2014, SAE International, an automotive standardization body, published a classification system with six levels – ranging from fully manual to fully automated systems –, as J3016, Taxonomy and Definitions for Terms Related to On-Road Motor Vehicle Automated Driving Systems.

In February 2015, the UK Government announced it would oversee public trials of the LUTZ Pathfinder driverless pod in Milton Keynes.

In March 2015 Tesla Motors announced that it will introduce its Autopilot technology by mid 2015 through a software update for the cars equipped with the systems that allow autonomous driving. Some industry experts have raised questions about the legal status of autonomous driving in the U.S. and whether Model S owner would violate current state regulations when using the autopilot function. The few states that have passed laws allowing autonomous cars on the road limit their use for testing purposes, not the use by the general public. Also, there are questions about the liability for autonomous cars in case there is a mistake. A Tesla spokesman said there is:  Google's director of self-driving cars at the company said he does not think there is a regulatory block as far as the self-driving vehicle met crash-test and other safety standards. A spokesman for the National Highway Traffic Safety Administration (NHTSA) said that "any autonomous vehicle would need to meet applicable federal motor vehicle safety standards" and the NHTSA "will have the appropriate policies and regulations in place to ensure the safety of this type of vehicles."

In mid October 2015 Tesla Motors rolled out version 7 of their software in the U.S. that included Autopilot capability. On January 9, 2016, Tesla rolled out version 7.1 as an over-the-air update, adding a new "summon" feature that allows cars to self-park at parking locations without the driver in the car. Tesla's autonomous driving features are ahead of  production cars, and can be classified as is somewhere between level 2 and level 3 under the defunct NHTSA five levels of vehicle automation. At this levels the car can act autonomously but requires the full attention of the driver, who must be prepared to take control at a moment's notice. Autopilot is not fully autonomous and can't detect pedestrians or cyclists.

In February 2015 Volvo Cars announced its plans to lease 100 XC90 SUVs fitted with Drive Me Level 3 automation technology to residents of Gothenburg in 2017. The Drive Me XC90s will be equipped with Nvidia’s Drive PX 2 supercomputer, and will be driven autonomously in certain weather conditions and on one road that loops around the city. As part of Volvo's Drive Me project, the 100 cars in the Sweden test will have an interface called IntelliSafe Auto Pilot, a feature that will let drivers activate and deactivate the autonomous mode through specially-designed paddles on the steering wheel. The interface was developed to oversee how drivers will transfer control to a car's autonomous driving mode in future cars. Volvo considers autonomous driving systems as the tool that will help it meet the company's goal to have no one seriously injured or killed in a new Volvo by the year 2020.

In April 2015, a car designed by Delphi Automotive became the first automated vehicle to complete a coast-to-coast journey across North America. It traveled from San Francisco to New York, under computer control for 99% of that distance.

In July 2015, Google announced that the test vehicles in its driverless car project had been involved in 14 minor accidents since the project's inception in 2009. Chris Urmson, the project leader, said that all of the accidents were caused by humans driving other cars, and that 11 of the mishaps were rear-end collisions. "Our self-driving cars are being hit surprisingly often by other drivers who are distracted and not paying attention to the road. That's a big motivator for us." Over the six years of the project's existence the test vehicles had logged nearly 2 million miles on the road.

A*STAR's Institute for Infocomm Research (I2R) developed a self-driving vehicle which was the first to be approved in Singapore for public road testing at one-north in July 2015. It has ferried several dignitaries such as Prime Minister Lee Hsien Loong, Minister S. Iswaran, Minister Vivian Balakrishnan, and several ministers from other countries.

2016
In April 2016, Volvo announced plans to deploy 100 XC90 self-driving cars to test them in everyday driving conditions in China in 2017. Also in April 2016, the carmaker announced plans to begin a trial in London in 2017 with 100 Volvo XC90 plug-in hybrids fitted with Drive Me technology. The XC90s will be leased to everyday users, and the self-driving cars will log each and every journey, passing on that data to Thatcham Research, which will conduct a thorough analysis to examine how the car behaves in everyday situations as well as understanding how other road users and the car's occupants respond to autonomous driving decisions made by the car.

The first known fatal accident involving a vehicle being driven by itself took place in Williston, Florida on 7 May 2016 while a Tesla Model S electric car was engaged in Autopilot mode. The driver was killed in a crash with a large 18-wheel tractor-trailer. On 28 June 2016 the National Highway Traffic Safety Administration (NHTSA) opened a formal investigation into the accident working with the Florida Highway Patrol. According to the NHTSA, preliminary reports indicate the crash occurred when the tractor-trailer made a left turn in front of the Tesla at an intersection on a non-controlled access highway, and the car failed to apply the brakes. The car continued to travel after passing under the truck's trailer. The NHTSA's preliminary evaluation was opened to examine the design and performance of any automated driving systems in use at the time of the crash, which involves a population of an estimated 25,000 Model S cars.

In August 2016, Singapore launched the first self-driving taxi service (as a pilot), provided by an autonomous vehicle startup company called nuTonomy.

In September 2016, National Highway Traffic Safety Administration (NHTSA) adopted the SAE classification standard, and the SAE classification became widely accepted.

Starting October 2016, Tesla says that all of their cars are built with the necessary hardware to allow full self-driving capability at a safety level (SAE Level 5). The hardware includes eight surround cameras and twelve ultrasonic sensors, in addition to the  forward-facing radar with enhanced processing capabilities. The system will operate in "shadow mode" (processing without taking action) and send data back to Tesla to improve its abilities until the software is ready for deployment via over-the-air upgrades. Full autonomy is only likely after millions of miles of testing, and approval by authorities. Tesla Motors said it expected to enable full self-driving by the end of 2017, however, as of March 2021, this has not happened yet.

In September 2017, SAE and GM announced a new collegiate autonomous vehicle challenge: the SAE Autodrive Challenge. The goal of the four-year-long competition is to have a vehicle navigate an urban driving course in an automated driving mode as described by SAE Standard (J3016) level 4 definition by year four. Each team is provided with a 2017 Chevrolet Bolt EV to modify with state of the Art sensors. A total of 8 universities across North America participates in this competition: Kettering University, Michigan State University, Michigan Tech, North Carolina A&T University, Texas A&M University, University of Toronto, University of Waterloo, and Virginia Tech. The University of Toronto Team aUToronto has claimed all 4 years of first place award with their autonomous vehicle Zeus.

2017
On June 4, 2017, Audi stated that its new A8 would be fully self-driving for speeds up to 60 km/h using its Audi AI. Contrary to other cars, the driver would not have to do safety checks such as touching the steering wheel every 15 seconds to use this feature. The Audi A8 would therefore be the first production car to reach level 3 autonomous driving, meaning that the driver could safely turn their attention away from driving tasks, e.g. the driver can text or watch a movie. Audi would also be the first manufacturer to use a 3D LIDAR system in addition to cameras and ultrasonic sensors for their AI. This level 3 functionality was never implemented, and in April 2020 Audi announced that the system was not going to be activated.

2018
In March 2018, the death of Elaine Herzberg in Arizona was the first reported fatal crash involving a self-driving vehicle and a pedestrian in the United States. Later in the same month, San Francisco police issued a ticket to the passenger of a self-driving car that had failed to yield to a pedestrian in a crosswalk.

In March 2018, the world's first fully electric self-driving bus that is open to the general public is launched in Neuhausen am Rheinfall, Switzerland.

In December 2018, Waymo launched the first commercial robotaxi called "Waymo One"; users in the Phoenix metropolitan area use an app to request a pick-up.

2019
As of 2019, twenty-nine U.S. states have passed laws permitting autonomous cars.

2020s 
2020
In the 2020s, the first regulations related to automated features appear:
 Regulation (EU) 2019/2144 is defined in 2019 and applies from 2022 in the European Union for automated vehicles and for fully automated vehicles.
 In June 2020, UNECE WP.29 GRVA established regulation on SAE Level 3.

In October 2020 Tesla released a "beta" version of its "Full Self-Driving" software to a small group of testers in the United States.

In the 2020s multiple electric, autonomous buses open for public transport are being launched around the world.

2021
In March 2021, Honda began leasing in Japan a limited edition of 100 Legend Hybrid EX sedans equipped with the newly approved Level 3 automated driving equipment which was granted the safety certification by Japanese government to their autonomous "Traffic Jam Pilot" driving technology, and legally allow drivers to take their eyes off the road.

In April 2021, after four years of success in the Autodrive Challenge Series I, SAE and GM announced the second series of the SAE Autodrive Challenge. Participating university includes Kettering University, Michigan Tehcnological University, North Carolina A&T University, Ohio State University, Penn State University, Texas A&M University, University of Toronto, University of Wisconsin - Madison, Queens University, Virginia Tech. The University of Toronto Team aUToronto achieved their 5th time first place in this competition series.

In December 2021, Mercedes-Benz has received German approval for a Level 3 Automated Lane Keeping System (ALKS) self-driving technology complying with UN-R157 legal requirements.

2022
In May 2022, Mercedes-Benz launched sales of its Drive Pilot system in Germany. The system is capable of operating at SAE Level 3 autonomy and can be ordered for the company's S-Class and EQS models.

In December 2022, eve autonomy in Japan, a company backed by Yamaha Motor and TIER IV, launched the all-in-one autonomous transportation commercial service "eve auto" with EV work vehicle as the first SAE Level 4 service in Japan at nine sites, including Yamaha Motor's three factories, Prime Polymer's Anesaki Works, Panasonic's cold chain factory in the Oizumi area, Fuji Electric's Suzuka factory, Japan Logistic Systems Corp.'s Ageo Center, and ENEOS Corp.'s Negishi refinery.
Within this package service, the first dedicated insurance for the autonomous driving system provider is also included.

Notable projects 

 The DARPA Grand Challenge was held in 2004, 2005 and 2007 as an autonomous driving competition with millions of dollars in prize money.
 The Google driverless car project maintains a test fleet of autonomous vehicles that had driven  with no machine-caused accidents as of August 2012. By April 2014 700,000 autonomous miles (1,100,000 km) were logged. By December 2016, 2,000,000 miles (3,219,000 km) had been self driven.
 EUREKA Prometheus Project (1987–95) – was the €800 million research project conducted by EC on autonomous vehicles. Among its culmination points were the twin robot vehicles VITA-2 and VaMP of Daimler-Benz and Ernst Dickmanns, driving long At the time, this was the longest-ever journey conducted by an unmanned vehicle.
 "CityMobil2" (2012–16) – was the European Union funded research and development project of self-driving shuttle in Europe.
 "SIP-adus" (1st phase: 2014–2018, 2nd phase: 2019–2023), Japan's national project which was led by Cabinet Office to achieve legally approved Level 3 driving on public roads, and contributed to the amendment of related laws.
 Israel has significant research efforts to develop a fully autonomous border-patrol vehicle.  This originated with its success with Unmanned Combat Air Vehicles, and following the construction of the Israeli West Bank barrier.  Two projects, by Elbit Systems and Israel Aircraft Industries, are based on the locally produced Armored "Tomcar" and have the specific purpose of patrolling barrier fences against intrusions.
 The Oshkosh Corporation developed an autonomous military vehicle called TerraMax and is integrating its systems into some future vehicles.
 Apple electric car project "Titan" (2014– ) – became to have autonomous system subproject in 2015.
 Uber Advanced Technologies Group (ATG: 2015–21) – announced a partnership with Carnegie Mellon to develop its own autonomous cars.
 "nuTonomy" – Aptiv, and Optimus Ride, have been testing autonomous cars in the Boston Marine Industrial Park; in June 2018, permission expanded to the entire city of Boston with a framework to expand to other cities in Eastern Massachusetts.
 "L3Pilot" (2017–22) – a large-scale piloting of automated driving with developed SAE Level 3  and Level 4 functions in passenger cars was conducted in Europe during the period between September 2017 and February 2022.
 "Avenue" (2018–22) – under EU funding programme Horizon 2020, a large scale self-driving shuttle project was conducted in four cities (Geneva, Lyon, Copenhagen and Luxembourg).
 "Torc Robotics" (2019– ) – has been testing autonomous vehicles across the southeastern United States. Torc previously produced military vehicles, autonomous shuttles, and self-driving cars in partnership with AAA.

University projects 

 The ARGO vehicle (see History above) is the predecessor of the BRAiVE vehicle, both from the University of Parma's VisLab. Argo was developed in 1996 and demonstrated to the world in 1998; BRAiVE was developed in 2008 and demonstrated in 2009 at the IEEE IV conference in Xi'an, China.
 In 2012, Stanford's Dynamic Design Lab, in collaboration with the Volkswagen Electronics Research Lab, produced Shelley, an Audi TTS designed for high speed (greater than ) on a racetrack course.
 Oxford University's "WildCat Project" (2011) – created a modified Bowler Wildcat which is capable of autonomous operation using a flexible and diverse sensor suite.
 Oxford University's "RobotCar UK" project (2013) – an inexpensive autonomous car capable of quickly switching from manual driving to autopilot on learned routes.
 "AutoNOMOS" – a part of the Artificial Intelligence Group of the Free University of Berlin.
 Zeus – an autonomous vehicle system developed by students at the University of Toronto, achieved four times first place in the SAE Autodrive Challenge Series I and became one of the first groups to bring autonomous vehicles to life in Toronto, Canada.

History of self-driving cars laws 

In December 2017, the Norwegian Parliament passed the Act relating to testing of self-driving vehicles. The Act was implemented in 2018 and allows interested parties to test self-driving vehicles on public roads.

In March 2018, France adopted act to ease experimentation on public roads of driving delegation vehicles.

In 2018, the UK regulated Automated and Electric Vehicles in the Automated and Electric Vehicles Act 2018 which received Royal Assent on 19 July 2018.

Testing of automated vehicles has been taking place for years in some parts of the United States led by Silicon Valley companies. However, some of the states have already banned the use of automated vehicles on the road. As a result, the United States Congress is discussing a bill for a Self-Drive Act which will introduce principles similar to the EU vehicle approval framework to avoid individual states of the United States adopting laws contradicting federal vehicle rules.

In 2019, Japan amended two laws, "Road Traffic Act" and "Road Transport Vehicle Act", and they came into effect in April 2020.
In the former act, Level 3 self driving cars became allowed on public roads.
In the latter act, process to designate types for safety certification on Level 3 self driving function of
Autonomous Driving System (ADS) and the certification process for the asserted type were legally defined.
Through the amendment process, the achievements from the national project "SIP-adus" led by Cabinet Office since 2014 were fully considered and accepted.

Until 27 October 2020 British Government is seeking views to understand if ALKS technology is compliant with the definition of automation under the Automated and Electric Vehicles Act 2018. This act requires that the vehicle be capable of safely and lawfully driving itself without being controlled and without needing to be monitored, when in automated mode

In July 2021, France updated its code de la route law in regard to automated vehicles (véhicule à délégation de conduite).
Also in the month in Germany, the Federal Act Amending the Road Traffic Act and the Compulsory Insurance Act (Autonomous Driving Act) came into effect.
The Act allows motor vehicles with autonomous driving capabilities, meaning vehicles that can perform driving tasks independently without a person driving, in specified operating areas on public roads. Provisions about autonomous driving in appropriate operating areas correspond to Level 4.

See also
 Self-driving car

References

History of the automobile